Podu is a 2020 Sri Lankan action romantic teledrama broadcast on TV Derana. The series is directed by Sharmila Dharmarasa Fonseka and produced by TV Derana. The first season was aired on 28 November 2020, every weekend at 8.30 pm. The season one ended on 27 December 2020 after airing 10 episodes.

The season 1 starred Randika Gunathilaka and Lahiruni Salwathura in lead roles along with Manoja Fernando, Rasadari Peiris and Kalana Gunasekara in supportive roles. Popular television presenter Thanuja Jayawardana also made her acting debut with the season one. The show became a popular serial, where the crew had to film the second season as well.

The second season titled Podu 2 was launched at a red carpet event and was aired on 29 January 2022. Kalana Gunasekara, Randika Gunathilaka, and Lahuruni Salwathura reprised their roles from the first season. In the second season, the director introduced Michelle Dilhara, Aishwarya S. Varman and Dushyantha Hettiarachchi into the regular cast.

Seasons

Plot
The main storyline of the first season is about the love story of Adi and Nilu. Nilu Alagiyawanna and Kaushi Wijetunga are best friends. Kaushi's brother is Aditya Wijetunga, who is a broad-minded, progressive man who is always looking for solutions to people's problems. The trio have lived together since adolescence and their relationship grows through various events during school and university. Meanwhile, the love of Nilu and Adi is growing in their hearts. But after university life, Aditya serves as the Media Secretary to Mahasen Gunaratne, the Minister of Agriculture and Lands. Finally, Nilu and Aditya decided to get married. But, Aditya's car crashes on Engagement Day which led to memory loss.

Season two portrays the story of Primal Weerarathna's university life and his love triangle with Dushee and Priya. Primal comes from a low income family and he speaks on behalf of the poor. Eventually he starts a relationship with Priya. Unaware of their relationship, Dushee who is the daughter of the politician Mahasen Gunarathna, falls for Primal. But Primal rejects her due to her family status and caste. Meanwhile, Primal meets Adi at the university and they become best friends. The story continues with their love triangle and the obstacles they have to face due to their family backgrounds and caste.

Cast

Main
 Randika Gunathilaka as Adithya Wijetunga 
 Lahiruni Salwathura as Nilu Alagiyawenna
 Kalana Gunasekara as Primal
 Michelle Dilhara as Dushee 
 Aishwarya S Varman as Priya
 Dushyantha Hettiarachchi as Ishan

Supportive cast
 Thanuja Jayawardana as Vasugi 
 Priyantha Sirikumara as Mahasen Gunarathne
 Thilina de Silva
 Koralage Saman
 Manoja Fernando as Kaushi Wijetunga
 Rasadari Peiris as Adithya's mother
 Lakranga Hewawitharana
 Janaka Kumbukage
 Anuruddhika Padukkage as Shaama 
 Gayani Gisanthika as Nilu's mother
 Kumara Jayakantha as Wijethunga
 Hyacinth Wijeratne
 Sampath Jayaweera as Sudewa Rathnasiri
 Devnaka Porage as Dilan
 Hemasiri Liyanage
 Harsha Prabath
 Manuaka Rathnayake*
 Thilakshini Ratnayake as Teacher

Critical response
First season of the series started as a mini series, but it became one of the most popular television shows during the airing. The TV series gained more viewers on television during the telecast. The theme song of the teledrama "Oya As Katha Karanawa" reached YouTube Trending #1 due to the popularity gained by the teledrama. Due to the huge popularity from the first season, the producers made the second season as a regular multi episode series.

References

External links
 

Sri Lankan television shows
2020 Sri Lankan television series debuts
TV Derana original programming